Bluestone River is a waterway located on the Seward Peninsula in the U.S. state of Alaska. It was named in 1900 by Edward Chester Barnard, topographer of the United States Geological Survey.

History
After gold was discovered in the early summer of 1900, mining operations commenced. Settlements sprung up near and on Port Clarence, the larger being Teller, which, by autumn 1900, had a post office and a population of about 1,000.

Placer mining operations have been noted at several locations in the river since 1969.

Geography
The headwaters of the Bluestone River form in a valley, where it drains the region between Grantley Harbor and the Bering Sea, an area known as the Bluestone region. The drainage is situated between the Kigluaik Mountains and Port Clarence. The area contains flat-topped hills. Here, the river valley is characterized as being broad, with flood plains measuring at least  in width. Above this section of the river the valley contains a steep-walled canyon noting flat-topped mountains  in height. Where the river valley broadens, it forks instead of expanding into a broad flood plain. The western split is known as Right Fork. It, too, follows a crooked course, traveling westward before turning to the east at the junction with Gold Run; Right Fork also has several tributaries.

Geology
The geological formations recorded in the river basin consist generally of a metapelitic sequence. Mafic intrusives have been noted in the locally metamorphosed zones. The Bluestone basin features mica and chlorite schists, beds of limestone, intrusive mafic masses altered to greenstone, and small quartz veins, particularly in the Gold Run Creek, a southern and eastern tributary of the Bluestone River. In some areas, minerals recorded are blueschist facies and retrograde greenschist facies. The geological age of these formations is conjectured as Paleozoic. Gold found on benches and in the main drainage was reported to be fine grained material and some nuggets were also recovered. The gold–bearing gravels were found to have cinnabar and platinum-group metals. Gold was also found in a tributary mining location on Skookum Creek.

See also
List of rivers of Alaska

References

Bibliography

 

Gold mining in Alaska
Rivers of the Seward Peninsula
Rivers of Alaska
Rivers of Nome Census Area, Alaska
Rivers of Unorganized Borough, Alaska